Canaan Elijah Smith-Njigba (born April 30, 1999) is an American professional baseball outfielder for the Pittsburgh Pirates of Major League Baseball (MLB). He made his MLB debut in 2022.

Amateur career
Smith-Njigba attended Rockwall-Heath High School in Heath, Texas, where he played baseball. He committed to play college baseball at the University of Arkansas. During his senior year, he garnered attention after he was intentionally walked 32 times in 24 games, or a rate of 1.67 per game. After his senior season, he was selected by the New York Yankees in the fourth round of the 2017 Major League Baseball draft.

Professional career

New York Yankees organization
After signing with the Yankees, Smith-Njigba made his professional debut with the Rookie-level Gulf Coast League Yankees, slashing .289/.430/.422 with five home runs and 28 RBIs over 57 games. In 2018, he played with the Staten Island Yankees of the Class A Short Season New York–Penn League where he hit .191 with three home runs and 16 RBIs over 45 games, missing time due to injury. In 2019, he played for the Charleston RiverDogs of the Class A South Atlantic League, with whom he earned All-Star honors. Over 124 games, he batted .307/.405/.465 with 11 home runs, 74 RBIs, and 16 stolen bases. He did not play a minor league game in 2020 since the season was cancelled due to the COVID-19 pandemic.

Pittsburgh Pirates
On January 24, 2021, the Yankees traded Smith-Njigba (alongside Miguel Yajure, Roansy Contreras and Maikol Escotto) to the Pittsburgh Pirates in exchange for Jameson Taillon. He was assigned to the Altoona Curve of the Double-A Northeast for a majority of the 2021 season. He was placed on the injured list briefly at the end of July, but activated in early August. He was placed back on the injured list in mid-August with a thigh injury, but was activated one month later. Over 66 games, he hit .274/.398/.406 with six home runs, 40 RBIs, and 13 stolen bases. Following the end of Altoona's season in mid-September, he was promoted to the Indianapolis Indians of the Triple-A East with whom he appeared in seven games. He was selected to play in the Arizona Fall League for the Peoria Javelinas after the season. On November 19, 2021, the Pirates selected his contract and added him to their 40-man roster. He returned to the Indians to begin the 2022 season.

On June 13, 2022, the Pirates promoted Smith-Njigba to the major leagues. He registered his first major league hit the next night while pinch-hitting and recorded a double off of St. Louis Cardinals relief pitcher Giovanny Gallegos. On June 17, he was placed on the 60-day injured list with a wrist fracture.

Personal life
Smith-Njigba is the older brother of Ohio State wide receiver Jaxon Smith-Njigba. Smith-Njigba's grandparents are from Sierra Leone.

References

External links

1999 births
Living people
People from Heath, Texas
Baseball players from Dallas
Major League Baseball outfielders
Pittsburgh Pirates players
Gulf Coast Yankees players
Staten Island Yankees players
Charleston RiverDogs players
Altoona Curve players
Indianapolis Indians players
American people of Sierra Leonean descent
African-American baseball players
Sportspeople of Sierra Leonean descent
Peoria Javelinas players